Vera Molnar (1923–1986) was a German film actress. Partly of Hungarian descent, she was discovered by the film director Géza von Cziffra who cast her in prominent roles in several of his productions.

Selected filmography
 Dangerous Guests (1949)
 Gabriela (1950)
 Third from the Right (1950)
 The Man in Search of Himself (1950)
 A Tale of Five Cities (1951)
 My Friend the Thief (1951) 
 Immortal Melodies (1952)
 The Colourful Dream (1952)
 The Cousin from Nowhere (1953)
 Where Is Freedom? (1954) 
 The Confession of Ina Kahr (1954) 
 Tight Quarters (1983)

References

Bibliography
 Goble, Alan. The Complete Index to Literary Sources in Film. Walter de Gruyter, 1999.

External links

1923 births
1986 deaths
German emigrants to Italy
German film actresses
20th-century German actresses
German people of Hungarian descent
Actors from Frankfurt